The George and Cynthia Mitchell Memorial Causeway is a set of causeways in Galveston, Texas, United States. Two of the routes carry the southbound and northbound traffic of Interstate 45, while the original causeway is restricted to rail traffic. It is the main roadway access point to Galveston Island. The second access point is Bolivar Ferry.

The causeway carries traffic over Galveston Bay and the Gulf Intracoastal Waterway. The original causeway was built in 1912 and carried both rail and auto traffic. The auto traffic was transferred to new causeways built to the west in 1939, leaving the original bridge for rail traffic. The original route was listed on the National Register of Historic Places in 1976.

Rebuilding in 2003

Construction of replacement bridges for both auto routes began in 2003 with completion of the new northbound bridge in 2005. The construction of a new southbound bridge began in 2006, however Hurricane Ike delayed completion until November 2008.

2008 hurricane damage
In September 2008, the causeway flooded badly before Hurricane Ike due to the tremendous storm surge created by the very wide storm. This is in contrast to a typical hurricane, which would cause the closure of the causeway due to wind before surge. As of the early afternoon on September 13, 12 hours after official landfall, the causeway was blocked by numerous watercraft.

Railroad drawbridge replacement

The original drawspan was replaced in 1987 with a new, narrower bascule span that pivoted from the island side of instead of the mainland side as the original did. The new span did not include space for a roadway, and a new service building was built on the old roadway on the island side of the channel. In 2012, the bascule-type drawbridge on the railroad causeway was again replaced with a vertical-lift-type drawbridge, allowing the navigation channel through the draw span to be widened. In 2001, the U.S. Coast Guard had declared the old span's narrow passageway to be a hazard to navigation. The old bridge was sold to Sonoma–Marin Area Rail Transit to be installed on the Northwestern Pacific Railroad in Petaluma, California to cross the Petaluma River.

Re-dedication 
The causeway was re-dedicated in honor of George Mitchell and his wife Cynthia Woods-Mitchell on Tuesday October 25, 2016, to honor their contributions to the island and City of Galveston.

See also

List of bridges documented by the Historic American Engineering Record in Texas
National Register of Historic Places listings in Galveston County, Texas

References

External links

City of Galveston Thoroughfare Plan - Transportation access to Galveston planning

Interstate 45
Buildings and structures in Galveston, Texas
Bridges completed in 1912
Road bridges on the National Register of Historic Places in Texas
Railroad bridges on the National Register of Historic Places in Texas
Historic American Engineering Record in Texas
National Register of Historic Places in Galveston County, Texas
Bascule bridges in the United States
Drawbridges on the National Register of Historic Places
Vertical lift bridges in the United States
Bridges on the Interstate Highway System
1912 establishments in Texas
Towers in Texas